Events from the year 1933 in Canada.

Incumbents

Crown 
 Monarch – George V

Federal government 
 Governor General – Vere Ponsonby, 9th Earl of Bessborough 
 Prime Minister – Richard Bedford Bennett
 Chief Justice – Francis Alexander Anglin (Ontario) (until 28 February) then Lyman Poore Duff (British Columbia)
 Parliament – 17th

Provincial governments

Lieutenant governors 
Lieutenant Governor of Alberta – William Legh Walsh 
Lieutenant Governor of British Columbia – John William Fordham Johnson 
Lieutenant Governor of Manitoba – James Duncan McGregor
Lieutenant Governor of New Brunswick – Hugh Havelock McLean
Lieutenant Governor of Nova Scotia – Walter Harold Covert 
Lieutenant Governor of Ontario – Herbert Alexander Bruce 
Lieutenant Governor of Prince Edward Island – Charles Dalton (until December 9) then George Des Brisay de Blois (from December 28)
Lieutenant Governor of Quebec – Henry George Carroll
Lieutenant Governor of Saskatchewan – Hugh Edwin Munroe

Premiers 
Premier of Alberta – John Edward Brownlee
Premier of British Columbia – Simon Fraser Tolmie (until November 15) then Duff Pattullo 
Premier of Manitoba – John Bracken 
Premier of New Brunswick – Charles Dow Richards (until June 1) then Leonard Tilley 
Premier of Nova Scotia – Gordon Sidney Harrington (until September 5) then Angus Lewis Macdonald
Premier of Ontario – George Stewart Henry 
Premier of Prince Edward Island – James D. Stewart (until October 10) then William J. P. MacMillan (from October 14)
Premier of Quebec – Louis-Alexandre Taschereau 
Premier of Saskatchewan – James Thomas Milton Anderson

Territorial governments

Commissioners 
 Controller of Yukon – George A. Jeckell 
 Commissioner of Northwest Territories – Hugh Rowatt

Events
 April 7 - Raymond Paley becomes the first known skiing fatality in the Canadian Rockies on Fossil Mountain.
 June 1 - Leonard Tilley becomes premier of New Brunswick, replacing Charles Richards
 August 16 - The Christie Pits riot between Jews and Nazi sympathizers in Toronto.
 September 5 - Angus Macdonald becomes premier of Nova Scotia, replacing Gordon Harrington
 October 14 - W. J. P. MacMillan becomes premier of Prince Edward Island, replacing James D. Stewart
 November 11 - The magnitude 7.3 Baffin Bay earthquake occurs at Baffin Bay, Northwest Territories.
 November 15 - Thomas Pattullo becomes premier of British Columbia, replacing Simon Fraser Tolmie
 December 2 - Newfoundland's independence is revoked due to its financial difficulties.

Arts and literature

Sport 
April 6 – The Ontario Hockey Association's Newmarket Redmen win their first Memorial Cup by defeating the South Saskatchewan Junior Hockey League's Regina Pats 2 games to 0. All games were played at Maple Leaf Gardens in Toronto
December 9 – The Toronto Argonauts win their third Grey Cup by defeating the Sarnia Imperials 4–3 at Sarnia's Davis Field

Births

January to March
 January 24 - Claude Préfontaine, actor (d. 2013)
 January 25 - Alden Nowlan, poet, novelist, playwright and journalist (d. 1983)
 January 31 - Camille Henry, ice hockey player (d. 1997)
 February 13 - Michael Cook, playwright (d. 1994)
 February 16 – Tom Hickey, Canadian politician (d. 2020)
 February 18 - Frank Moores, businessman, politician and 2nd Premier of Newfoundland (d. 2005)
 February 24 - Gustavo Da Roza, architect
 March 2 - Simonie Michael, Inuk politician (d. 2008)
 March 4 - James Jerome, jurist, politician and Speaker of the House of Commons of Canada (d. 2005)
 March 9 - Mel Lastman, businessman, politician and Mayor of Toronto (d. 2021)
 March 19 
 John Sopinka, lawyer and puisne justice on the Supreme Court of Canada (d. 1997)
 Richard Williams, Canadian-British animator (d. 2019)
 March 23 - Thomas R. Berger, politician and jurist (d. 2021)
 March 29 - Jacques Brault, poet and translator

April to June

 April 5 - Joe Comuzzi, politician (d. 2022)
 April 19
 Peter Demeter, murderer
 Garry Blaine, ice hockey player (d. 1998)
 April 24 - Alan Eagleson, disbarred lawyer, convicted felon, former politician, hockey agent and promoter
 May 24 - Marian Engel, novelist (d. 1985)
 May 29 - Marc Carbonneau, taxi driver and convicted kidnapper
 June 19 - Michael M. Ames, anthropologist and academic (d. 2006)
 June 24 
 Bob Cole, sports television announcer
 Bernard Grandmaître, politician
 June 26 - Gerry Weiner, politician
 June 28 
 Antonio Flamand, politician
 Gisèle Lalonde, politician and community activist, mayor of Vanier, Ontario (1985–1992) (d. 2022)
 George Stulac, basketball player and decathlete
 June 30
 Don Head, ice hockey player
 Orval Tessier, ice hockey centre and coach (d. 2022)

July to September
 July 2 – Kenny Wharram, ice hockey player (d. 2017)
 July 8 - Antonio Lamer, lawyer, jurist and 16th Chief Justice of Canada (d. 2007)
 July 13 - Scott Symons, writer (d. 2009)
 July 14 - Robert Bourassa, politician and 22nd Premier of Quebec (d. 1996)
 July 16 - Julian Klymkiw, ice hockey goaltender (d. 2022)
 July 17 - Mimi Hines, singer and comedian 
 July 28
David Ahenakew, politician (d. 2010)
Charlie Hodge, ice hockey goaltender (d. 2016)
 August 13 - Ted Godwin, artist (d. 2013)
 August 24 - John Alan Lee, sociologist (d. 2013)
 August 30 - Don Getty, politician and 11th Premier of Alberta (d. 2016)
 September 8 - Maurice Foster, politician, MP for Algoma (1968–1993) (d. 2010)
 September 19 - Gilles Archambault, novelist

October to December
 October 12 - Guido Molinari, artist (d. 2004)
 October 22 - David Bromige, poet (d. 2009)
 November 16 - Leonard Marchand, politician (d. 2016)
 November 26 - Robert Goulet, singer and actor (d. 2007)
 November 27 - Jacques Godbout, novelist, essayist, children's writer, journalist, filmmaker and poet
 December 1 - Alex Campbell, politician and Premier of Prince Edward Island
 December 12 - Joe Borowski, politician and activist (d. 1996)
 December 25 - Fred Sasakamoose, ice hockey player (d. 2020)

Full date unknown
 Harry Flemming, journalist (d. 2008)
 Doreen Kimura, psychologist who was professor at Simon Fraser University (d. 2013)

Deaths
 January 3 - Jack Pickford, actor (b. 1896)
 April 14 - Daniel Hunter McMillan, politician and Lieutenant-Governor of Manitoba (b. 1846)
 October 10 - James David Stewart, educator, lawyer, politician and Premier of Prince Edward Island (b. 1874)
 October 17 - Emily Murphy, women's rights activist, jurist and author, first woman magistrate in Canada and in the British Empire (b. 1868)
 October 25 - William John Bowser, politician and Premier of British Columbia (b. 1867)
 November 30 - Arthur Currie, World War I general (b. 1875)

See also
 List of Canadian films

Historical documents
Montreal Gazette report finds that, after bad start, 1933 has brought industrial expansion and "a general revival of confidence"

"With a cheery, optimistic feeling prevailing," grain markets in Winnipeg, Chicago and Liverpool raise price of wheat

In what "has been a very bad year," federal budget raises taxes and creates support fund for agricultural exporters

"Heavy obligations" from resource and production investment call for debt conversion, budget balancing and international agreement

Most first ministers back re-employment through shortening of everyone's work day (but unemployment insurance scheme doubtful)

Hitler sworn in as German chancellor, but "surrounded with conservatives" in cabinet

With Nazi plurality, German parliament will allow Hitler to suspend its powers and constitution temporarily

Appeals to Jewish community and Christians to relieve oppression of German Jews

Co-operative Commonwealth Federation rejects capitalism and "its inherent injustice and inhumanity" in Regina Manifesto

Marxist delegate to CCF's Regina convention calls it "middle class" and "reformist"

Rejected in Saskatchewan by-election, Farmer-Labor (CCF) candidates and campaign managers receive advice from their president

Spinning wheel and Bennett buggy: how Prairie farmers are coping in Great Depression

Poor woman asks Prime Minister Bennett to send underwear for her husband (and request is fulfilled)

Memorial plaque unveiled at University of Saskatchewan for 46th Battalion

Mackenzie King yields to temptation, being "disobedient to the heavenly vision as I have held it in my heart"

Flyer for opening of Harlem-style nightclub in Montreal (note: blackface depicted)

References

 
Years of the 20th century in Canada
Canada
1933 in North America
1930s in Canada